Eumitra suduirauti is a species of sea snail, a marine gastropod mollusk, in the family Mitridae, the miters or miter snails.

Description
The length of the shell attains 51.7 mm.

Distribution
This marine species occurs off the Philippines.

Distribution
This species occurs in Philippines.

References

suduirauti
Gastropods described in 1997